Krasnoarmeysk is a town in Moscow Oblast, Russia, on the Vorya (Klyazma's tributary)  northeast of Moscow. Population:

History
The town grew from the village of Muromtsevo, where a textile factory was established in 1834. In 1928, the settlements around the textile factory were merged into the settlement of Krasnoflotsky, which in 1929 was renamed Krasnoarmeysky. Town status was granted to the settlement in 1947, when it was renamed Krasnoarmeysk.

Administrative and municipal status
Within the framework of administrative divisions, it is incorporated as Krasnoarmeysk Town Under Oblast Jurisdiction—an administrative unit with the status equal to that of the districts. As a municipal division, Krasnoarmeysk Town Under Oblast Jurisdiction is incorporated as Krasnoarmeysk Urban Okrug.

Economy

Transportation

Krasnoarmeysk is a terminal station on a railway line branching in Sofrino from the railway connecting Moscow and Yaroslavl. There is an (infrequent) passenger service from Yaroslavsky railway station in Moscow.

Notable residents 

Vladimir Gerasimov (born 1975), footballer
Alexander Legkov (born 1983), cross-country skier

References

Notes

Sources

Cities and towns in Moscow Oblast
Naukograds
Renamed localities of Moscow Oblast